Arrifana is a Portuguese parish, located in the municipality of Santa Maria da Feira. The population in 2011 was 6,551, in an area of 5.29 km2. Its local inhabitants are known as Arrifanense.

Sporting clubs

Clube Desportivo Arrifanense

References

Freguesias of Santa Maria da Feira